De Haan (literally The Rooster) is a place and a municipality located in the Belgian province of West Flanders. The municipality comprises the villages of De Haan proper, Wenduine, Klemskerke, Vlissegem and Harendijk. On January 1, 2020 De Haan had a total population of 12,700. The total area is 46.14 km² (26.2 Miles) which gives a population density of 275.26 inhabitants per km².

The coastal village of De Haan proper has maintained a low skyline so its many buildings in Belle Époque style are still prominently visible.

The town has an 18-hole golf course situated in its dunes, founded by King Leopold II in 1903. Today, it is the only links course in the country.

Its most famous resident was Albert Einstein, who lived in the villa "Savoyarde" for six months in 1933 after leaving Nazi Germany.

Photo gallery

Sports
Women's volleyball club Volley De Haan plays at the highest level of the Belgian league pyramid.

Transport 
All of the below are operated by De Lijn

Tram 
De Haan has 10 stations on The Coast Tram.

Bus 
The municipality is served by bus lines 31, 35 and 46.

References

External links

Official website  - Information available in Dutch and limited information available in French, English and German
photos of De Haan

 
Municipalities of West Flanders